Oxymoron is the ninth and most recent album by British singer-songwriter Nik Kershaw, released on 16 October 2020. The album was recorded at Abbey Road Studios. 

An EP, These Little Things, containing six of the albums tracks, was released on 26 June 2020 to promote the album. The album's first and only single, "From Cloudy Bay to Malibu", was released on 11 September 2020 and was played by Ken Bruce on BBC Radio 2 two days prior. Kershaw also appeared on Robert Elms's BBC Radio London show to promote the album.

Though the album had very little promotion, it was strongly encouraged on with fan promotion by Dark Corner Productions, who created a series of 'Unofficial Music Videos'. On 6 June 2021, Izzy Kershaw, Nik's daughter, praised Dark Corner Productions efforts and quoted via her Facebook; "A Fan of mine and my Dad's music, made a music video for my dad's song: 'The Chosen Ones' and it's actually really good. It's a shame dad didn't get a proper music video done for it because of lockdown. So, it's really lovely to see someone else take up the job out of just love for his music."

The album was released through Audio Network, a service for music used in film and TV owned by Entertainment One.

Reception
The album received mostly positive reviews from critics, with Essentially Pop stating that the songs will "stand the test of time" like Kershaw’s earlier catalogue.

Track listing
All tracks written by Nik Kershaw.
 "The Chosen Ones" – 3:59
 "From Cloudy Bay to Malibu" – 4:27
 "Can't Go On" – 3:47
 "The Wind Will Blow" – 3:33
 "I Do Believe" – 4:15
 "The Best I Can" – 4:30
 "Roundabouts and Swings" – 3:54
 "She Gets Me" – 4:20
 "Babylon Brothers" – 4:41
 "Little Star" – 3:30
 "Let's Get Lost" – 4:43
 "Come Back Tomorrow" – 3:34
 "These Little Things" – 5:09
 "Long Live the King" – 3:19
 "The Smallest Soul" – 4:23
 "They Were There" – 4:34

References

2020 albums
Nik Kershaw albums